Amazon Creek is a stream that runs through southeastern and western Eugene, Oregon, United States.  It is a tributary of the Long Tom River and is Eugene's second-largest waterway after the Willamette River.

Background
Amazon Creek's headwaters are located in Eugene's southeast hills near Spencer Butte.  The creek bed has been altered from the foot of Spencer Butte so it flows north from Martin Street through Amazon Park in a channel. At 24th street it enters a 1.75 mile concrete channel. The stream travels north to 18th Avenue, turning west near High Street and continuing into the levee channel (diversion canal) near the Lane County Fairgrounds at Jefferson Street. It continues west to Fern Ridge Reservoir and the Long Tom River. It collects water from 21 square miles of urban landscapes and storm drains, providing flood control, wildlife habitat, and recreation.

In 1946, the U.S. Army Corps of Engineers widened, deepened, and realigned the creek from Hilyard Street to Fern Ridge Reservoir in a diversion canal as a means of controlling floodwaters in the area. The Amazon flood control project was completed in 1958, using a trapezoidal channel designed to withstand a 25-year flood.

The lower reach of Amazon Creek from Bailey Hill Road to the Coos Bay Rail Link (former Southern Pacific Railway) rail line has been the subject of current restoration efforts to widen the creek and plant native species along the banks. The City of Eugene has designated Amazon Creek as a natural area, noting, "These areas support a wide diversity of plants and wildlife, including many endangered and rare species. These areas also provide valuable ecosystem services… and many other important functions that benefit our community."

Geography

Coordinates

See also
List of rivers of Oregon

References

External links

Amazon Creek Priority Planning Area from Metro Waterways: A Study of the Eugene-Springfield Metropolitan Region

Geography of Eugene, Oregon
Rivers of Oregon
Rivers of Lane County, Oregon